Paul St George is a London based multimedia artist and sculptor, best known for The Telectroscope, an art installation visually linking London and New York.

St George's other projects have included Minumentals, miniatures of famous large-scale sculptures such as The Angel of the North, for the Locus + arts organization, and Revelation, a multimedia installation at Gunpowder Park in Waltham Abbey, Essex.<ref>Kendal, Maureen, Revelation at Gunpowder Park], Landscape & Art, No. 30, Winter 2003/2004 pp. 6–8. Retrieved 25 May 2008.</ref> He was one of the contributing artists to and curator of [http://www.sequences.org.uk/ Sequences, an exhibition of contemporary art and chronophotography which toured six cities in the UK in 2004/2005. He was also the editor of  Sequences: Contemporary Chronophotography and Experimental Digital Art.

Life and works

Paul St George's father was an acrobatic tap dancer, his mother a costume designer. They were midway through a world tour of Kiss Me Kate when Paul was born – he started life in Norway, was weaned in Sweden, toddled in Finland but went to school in Bristol, England.

St George studied at Bath Academy of Art in Corsham, Wiltshire. The college was situated right next to Lacock Abbey where Fox Talbot invented photography. Paul's fascination with the relationships between images and different realities started there.

As well as being an installation artist, Paul St George is Principal Lecturer in Computer Animation in the Sir John Cass Department of Art, Media & Design at London Metropolitan University.

Notable Works
St George's practice as an artist has always been concerned with questioning the relationship between the viewer and what is being viewed. His work is often associated with different realities, spectacle and viewer participation.

The Telectroscope – A steampunk inspired public art project in New York and London linking the two cities in real time.

Supermoment – A project to highlight the hidden and ubiquitous technology in our lives through the use of LEDs in a dark room to show what we forget is there.

Carpet Castle – A playful project substituting carpet for sand.

Minumental sculpture – Recreating monumental contemporary sculptures on a miniature scale.

Chronocyclography – Photographs made from a trace of a person's movements to reveal the hidden dance and drawing from their actions.

Chronopan – imagery that contain both duration (chrono) and space (pan). Duration is enfolded into one image for example showing the change of light over a 10-hour exposure.

Trackorama – a print made from a camera that “tracks” along a line that can travel from one scene to another. This long tracking shot is laid out as a print on a wall.

Notes and references

Julian Stallabrass, Pauline van Mourik Broekman, Niru Ratnam (eds.), (2000) Locus Solus: Site, Identity, Technology in Contemporary Art, Black Dog Publishing. 
Paul St George (ed.), (2008) Sequences: Contemporary Chronophotography and Experimental Digital Art, Wallflower Press 

External links
Paul St George faculty page and portfolios at London Metropolitan University
Paul St George's Telectroscope Project:
The Telectroscope Project Blog

BBC News video of the Telectroscope Project

Robert Gore-Langton, This way to New York – through a 40ft-long Telectroscope, The Times, May 3, 2008. Retrieved 25 May 2008.
Melena Ryzik, Telescope Takes a Long View, to London, New York Times, May 21, 2008. Retrieved 25 May 2008.

Living people
British installation artists
Year of birth missing (living people)